Club Deportivo Arenteiro is a football team based in O Carballiño in the autonomous community of Galicia. Founded in 1958, it plays in Segunda División RFEF – Group 1. Its stadium is Espiñedo with a capacity of 4,500 seats.

Between 1990 and 2005 the club was known as Club Deportivo O Carballiño.

Season to season

2 seasons in Segunda División B
2 seasons in Segunda División RFEF
19 seasons in Tercera División

References

External links
Futbolme.com profile
senafutbolmarin.blogspot.com profile

Football clubs in Galicia (Spain)
Association football clubs established in 1958
Divisiones Regionales de Fútbol clubs
1958 establishments in Spain